Piacenza Calcio had their most successful season ever, with 41 points in 34 games, albeit just three points above the relegation zone. Much thanks to 15 times goal scorer Simone Inzaghi, Piacenza was able to secure a fifth consecutive season in the top flight. The remarkable finish with seven wins out of the last eleven, was key in determining the survival.

Squad

Goalkeepers
  Valerio Fiori
  Sergio Marcon
  Michele Nicoletti

Defenders
  Mauro Barberini
  Giordano Caini
  Daniele Cozzi
  Daniele Delli Carri
  Gianluca Lamacchi
  Alessandro Lucarelli
  Gian Paolo Manighetti
  Stefano Sacchetti
  Pietro Vierchowod

Midfielders
  Renato Buso
  Paolo Cristallini
  Alessandro Mazzola
  Daniele Moretti
  Gianpietro Piovani
  Adolfo Speranza
  Francesco Statuto
  Giovanni Stroppa
  Stefano Turi
  Francesco Varrenti

Attackers
  Davide Dionigi
  Simone Inzaghi
  Massimo Rastelli
  Ruggiero Rizzitelli
  Alberto Gilardino

Serie A

Matches

Top Scorers
  Simone Inzaghi 15 (8)
  Davide Dionigi 5 (1)
  Gianpietro Piovani 5 (1)
  Massimo Rastelli 4
  Pietro Vierchowod 3

References

Sources
  RSSSF - Italy Championship 1998/99

Piacenza Calcio 1919 seasons
Piacenza